is a historical Japanese term indicating an adolescent boy, used particularly during the Edo period (1603–1867).  status was indicated by haircut.

Appearance and ceremonies
 properly referred to a boy between the ages at which his head was partially shaven (about 7–17 years of age), at which point a boy exited early childhood and could begin formal education, apprenticeship, or employment outside the home, and the  coming of age ceremony (mid-teens through early 20s), which marked the transition to adulthood. During this period, the  wore a distinctive hairstyle, with a small shaved portion at the crown of the head and long forelocks at front and sides, and typically wore kimono with open sleeves; boys from wealthier families could wear . After the coming of age ceremony, the forelocks were shaved off, giving the adult male hairstyle, and the boy assumed the adult male style of kimono with rounded sleeves. Although any person would be clearly classified as a child,  or adult, the timing of both boundaries of the  period were relatively flexible, giving families and patrons the ability to accommodate the development and circumstances of the individual boy.

Sexuality 

In Edo-period Japan, adolescent boys were considered as suitable objects of erotic desire for young women, older women, and older men (as long as the latter played an active sexual role). This was the case particularly for male prostitutes, who would not be considered as a suitable object of homoerotic desire for older men ( or ) after reaching adulthood. In 1685 the shogunate reportedly cracked down on the so-called  (senior youths) who delayed their coming-of-age ceremony until their middle 20s. One of the stories in The Great Mirror of Male Love by Ihara Saikaku features a samurai  in his 60s.

In the arts 

 (lit. "the way of boy love") was associated both with erotic discernment (particularly among samurai) and with artistic refinement. In his book The Aesthetics of Boy Love Taruho Inagaki writes that only "members of a privileged class can understand the delights of boy love". The cult of youthful male beauty in Japanese literature may be traced as far back as the 11th-century classic The Tale of Genji, whose protagonist is described as "such an attractive figure that the other men felt a desire to see him as a woman".

 were prominently featured in Edo-period woodcuts, where they are often distinguishable from the female beauties in the same pictures only by a sword or the shaved spot on the crown of their head. In erotic prints, they are often depicted as more feminine than their female partners.

Prostitution and acting were closely linked in early kabuki theater.

Obsolescence 

In the Meiji period (1868–1912), the term became obsolete; the first meanings were replaced by the new term , and the last by the related construction  ("beautiful boy").

See also

 Catamite
 Greek love
 History of human sexuality
 Homoeroticism
 Homosexuality in ancient Greece
 Homosexuality in ancient Rome
 Homosexuality in China
 Homosexuality in India
 Homosexuality in Pre-Meiji Japan
 Kagema
 Kagemajaya (ja)
 Pederasty in ancient Greece
 Pederasty

References

Japanese sex terms
History of human sexuality
Japanese words and phrases